Suleiman (Arabic: سُلِيمَان sulaymān;  or ) is the Arabic name of the Quranic king and Islamic prophet Solomon meaning "man of peace", derived from the Hebrew name Shlomo. 

The name is also spelt as Sulaiman, Suleman, Soliman, Sulayman, Sulyman, Suleyman, Sulaman, Süleyman, Sulejman, Sleiman, Suliman, Solomon, Soleman, Solyman, Souleymane.

The name Suleiman is a diminutive of the name Salman (سَلْمان salmān). Both names stem from the male name Salaam.

Name
Featuring those named Suleiman. For other transliterations, refer to See also section

Given name

Historical
Suleyman Shah (died 1127), according to Ottoman tradition, father of Ertugrul
Suleiman-Shah (died 1161), Sultan of the Great Seljuq Empire
Suleiman ibn Qutulmish (died 1086), founder of the Sultanate of Rum
Süleyman Pasha (son of Orhan) (died 1357), Ottoman prince and commander
Süleyman Çelebi (1377–1411), de facto Ottoman ruler during the interregnum
Suleiman the Magnificent (1494–1566), also known as Suleiman I
Suleiman I of Persia (died 1694)
Suleiman II of Persia (died 1750)
Sulayman ibn al-Hakam (Suleiman II of Córdoba), (died 1016)
Suleiman II (Rûm) (died 1204), Seljuk Sultan of Rûm between 1196 and 1204
Suleiman II (1642–1691), Ottoman Sultan 1687–1691
Suleiman bin Abdullah Al Sheikh (1785–1818), Wahhabi scholar
Hadım Suleiman Pasha (governor of Rumelia), military commander under the reign of Mehmed II

Contemporary
Suleiman Al Abbas, Syrian politician
Suleiman Arabiyat (1938–2013), Jordanian academic and politician
Suleiman Braimoh (born 1989), Nigerian-American basketball player in the Israel Basketball Premier League
Suleiman Hafez (born 1941), Jordanian economist and politician
Suleiman Frangieh (1910–1992), President of Lebanon 1970 to 1976
Suleiman Frangieh Jr. (born 1965), Lebanese politician and MP, leader of the Marada Movement
Suleiman Khan, Ilkhan of Persia (ruled 1339–1344)
Suleiman Mousa (1919–2008), Jordanian author and historian
Suleiman Pasha (disambiguation), multiple people
Suleiman ibn Qutulmish (fl. 1077–1086), Seljuq Sultan of Rum
Sulieman Benn (born 1981), West Indian cricketer
Süleyman Demirel, former President of Turkey.

Mononym
Sleiman (rapper) (born 1982), Danish rapper of Lebanese origin
Slimane (singer) (born 1989), full name Slimane Nebchi, French singer of Algerian descent

Surname
Abdulrahman Suleiman (born 1984), Qatari middle-distance runner
Abu Bakar Suleiman (born 1944), Malaysian physician, academic administrator, business executive and former civil servant
Abubakar Umar Suleiman (born 1962), 11th Emir of Bade
Adamu Suleiman (born 1929), Nigerian policeman and former Inspector General
Ahmed Suleiman (born 1992), Nigerian footballer
Al-Sayed Suleiman
Ali Suliman (born 1977), Palestinian actor
Amna Suleiman (born 1988), teacher and advocate for women's cycling in Gaza
CA Suleiman, writer, game designer, and musician
Camelia Suleiman, American academic
Carmen Suleiman (born 1994)
Dan Suleiman (born 1942)
Elia Suleiman (born 1960), filmmaker and actor
Haroun Suleiman (born 1953), Zanzibari politician
Iszlam Monier Suliman (born 1990), Hungarian Sudanese judoka
Jaffar Suleiman, cricketer
Jamal Suliman (born 1959), prominent Syrian-born producer, director, and actor
Khalid Suliman (born 1987), professional basketball player
Khalifah Suleiman (born 1953), Jordanian jurist and politician
Khalil Suleiman (1940s–2002)
Linda Suleiman, American physician
Malina Suliman, Afghan artist
Mari ibn Suleiman, a 12th-century Nestorian Christian author
Martin Suleiman, South Sudanese footballer
Michel Suleiman (born 1948), president of Lebanon and former commander in chief of that country's armed forces
Mim Suleiman, singer, songwriter, composer, performer, workshop facilitator, and campaigner from Zanzibar
Mohamed Suleiman (born 1969), Qatari middle-distance runner
Mohamud Hassan Suleiman, Somali politician
Muhammad Suleiman (1959–2008), Syrian Army general
Omar Suleiman (imam) (born 1986), American Muslim scholar
Omar Suleiman (politician) (1936–2012), vice-president of Egypt
Rashid Seif Suleiman (born 1954), Zanzibar politician
Salamatu Hussaini Suleiman
Saleh Suleiman (1888–1980), Israeli Arab politician
Samaila Suleiman (born 1981), Member of the House of Representatives of Nigeria
Yasir Suleiman, Palestinian academic

See also 
Islamic view of Solomon
Sleiman
Slimane
Soliman (disambiguation)
Solomon
Sulaiman (disambiguation)
Sulayman
Suleiman (disambiguation)
Suleimani (disambiguation)
Sulejman
Suleman (disambiguation)
Suleyman
Süleymanoğlu
Sulliman

References

Arabic masculine given names
Bosniak masculine given names
Iranian masculine given names
Turkish masculine given names

br:Suleyman